Harry Sachdeva (born 17 November 1977) is known for his contributions to the film industry as a writer, director and film-producer, and his notable achievements in the import and distribution industry in India.

Early life
Sachdeva was born on 17 November 1977 in Delhi to a Sikh family and grew up listening to the stories of the 1984 anti-Sikh riots from his parents, Mr. DPS Sachdeva and Mrs. Tejinder Sachdeva.

Prior to his entry into the film industry, Sachdeva climbed the ranks in the import and distribution industry and played a key role in introducing numerous international brands to the Indian market. He is the driving force behind the entry of San Miguel, Krombacher, Kafer, Andes, and 30 other international brands in India. Currently, Sachdeva heads several companies, including Magical Dreams Productions, Wierdoff, Hotel Goodtimes, Gr8 Future Brands, Allied Spirits, Montage Distillery, and Jes & Ben Groupo.

In August 2016, Sachdeva established Jes & Ben Groupo, which has quickly made a name for itself by expanding its reach through 14 states in India. The company has also brought the third most sold, Hell Energy Drink, to India and has sold over 10 million cans with its innovative marketing and placement strategy. The company is also introducing a range of globally renowned products in India, including Tiffany Brand & Serene Juice, and a premium coconut water brand, Justé COCO.

Work
Sachdeva is known for his involvement in various business domains with a particular focus on the film and television industry. Additionally, he has established himself as a reputable food and beverage importer and marketer, having successfully launched the brand Hell Energy in India.

Film career 
Sachdeva made his debut with the film "31st October." The movie, released on October 21, 2016, depicts the true story of a family's survival during the 1984 anti-Sikh riots. It features actors Soha Ali Khan and Vir Das in lead roles and was well received at various international film festivals, including the London International Film Festival, Toronto International Film Festival, and Sikhhi International Film Festival.

Sachdeva worked with renowned industry professionals, such as Shivaji Lotan Patil, Ramani Ranjan Das, and Parvez Fazal Khan. In early 2019, he plans to direct two new films: "Divyaang," a movie based on Autism, and "I-Witness," which tells the story of India's most high-profile Honour Killing and a rarest of rare murder case.

Filmography

References

External links 

 

1977 births
Film directors from Delhi
Living people
Film producers from Delhi
Indian television producers